Wolf Fangs is a 1927 American action film directed by Lewis Seiler and written by Seton I. Miller and Elizabeth Pickett Chevalier. The film stars Thunder the Dog supported by Caryl Lincoln, Charles Morton, Frank Rice and James Gordon. Released in November 1927, the feature was produced and distributed by Fox Film Corporation.

Cast 
Thunder the Dog as Thunder
Caryl Lincoln as Ellen
Charles Morton as Neal Barrett
Frank Rice as Pete
James Gordon as Bill Garside

References

External links
 

1927 films
American action films
1920s action films
Fox Film films
Films directed by Lewis Seiler
American silent feature films
American black-and-white films
1920s English-language films
1920s American films